Strongylognathus christophi is a species of ant in the genus Strongylognathus. It is endemic to Russia.

References

Strongylognathus
Insects of Russia
Endemic fauna of Russia
Insects described in 1889
Taxonomy articles created by Polbot